The 2019 Donostia San Sebastian Klasikoa was a road cycling one-day race that took place on 3 August in San Sebastián, Spain. It was the first women's edition of the Clásica de San Sebastián. 

The 126.7km route covered four categorised climbs, including the Jaizkibel around the 40km mark, a tough steep climb which has often played a pivotal role in deciding the men's race.

Teams
Eighteen teams, each with a maximum of six riders, will start the race:

Results

See also
 2019 in women's road cycling

External links

References

 
2019 in Spanish road cycling